The Filmfare Best Supporting Actor Award is given by the Filmfare magazine as part of its annual Filmfare Awards for Telugu films.

The award was introduced and first given at the 50th South Filmfare Awards in 2002, with Prakash Raj being the first recipient.

Superlatives

        
 Jagapathi Babu holds the record of maximum wins with four awards, followed by Prakash Raj and Sai Kumar with 2 awards.

Winners
Here is a list of the award winners and the films for which they won.

Nominations
2020–2021: Murali Sharma – Ala Vaikunthapurramuloo
Jagapathi Babu – Republic
Praveen – Naandhi
Rahul Ramakrishna – Jathi Ratnalu
Sunil – Pushpaka Vimanam
Thiruveer – Palasa 1978
Vennela Kishore – Bheeshma
 2018: Jagapathi Babu – Aravinda Sametha Veera Raghava
 Aadhi Pinisetty – Rangasthalam
 Doddanna – Aatagadharaa Siva
 Mohan Bhagat – C/o Kancharapalem
 Naresh – Sammohanam
 R. Madhavan – Savyasachi
 Rahul Ramakrishna – Geetha Govindam
 2017: Rana Daggubati – Baahubali 2: The Conclusion
 Aadhi Pinisetty – Ninnu Kori
 Prakash Raj – Sathamanam Bhavati
 S. J. Suryah – Spyder
 Sathyaraj – Baahubali 2: The Conclusion
 2016: Jagapati Babu – Nannaku Prematho
 Arvind Swamy – Dhruva
 Mohanlal – Janatha Garage
 Rao Ramesh – A Aa
 Sathyaraj – Nenu Sailaja
 Karthi – Oopiri
2015: Allu Arjun – Rudhramadevi
Jagapati Babu – Srimanthudu
Posani Krishna Murali – Temper
Rana Daggubati – Baahubali: The Beginning
Sathyaraj – Baahubali: The Beginning
2014: Jagapati Babu – Legend
Ajay – Dikkulu Choodaku Ramayya
Prakash Raj – Govindudu Andarivadele
Sai Kumar – Yevadu
Srikanth – Govindudu Andarivadele
2013: Sunil – Tadakha
Brahmaji – Venkatadri Express
Prakash Raj – Seethamma Vakitlo Sirimalle Chettu
Sundeep Kishan – Gundello Godari
Venkatesh – Masala
2012: Sudeep – Eega
Brahmanandam – Denikaina Ready
P. Ravi Shankar – Damarukam
Posani Krishna Murali – Krishnam Vande Jagadgurum
Rajendra Prasad – Julayi
2011: M. S. Narayana – Dookudu
Akkineni Nageswara Rao – Sri Rama Rajyam
Jagapati Babu – Jai Bolo Telangana
Prakash Raj – Dookudu
Sonu Sood – Kandireega
2010: Sai Kumar – Prasthanam
Allari Naresh – Shambo Shiva Shambo
Brahmanandam – Adhurs
Naresh – Andari Bandhuvaya
Shafi – Khaleja
2009: Sonu Sood – Arundhati
Prakash Raj – Aakasamantha
Sayaji Shinde – Arundhati
Srihari – Magadheera
Venkatesh – Eenadu
2008: Allari Naresh – Gamyam
Brahmanandam – Ready
Jagapati Babu – Kathanayakudu
Prakash Raj – Kotha Bangaru Lokam
Srinivas Avasarala – Ashta Chamma
2007: Jagapati Babu – Lakshyam
Mohan Babu – Yamadonga
Rahul Haridas – Happy Days
Ravi Babu – Anasuya
Srihari – Dhee
2006: Sai Kumar – Samanyudu
Nassar – Pokiri
Prakash Raj – Bommarillu
Rajendra Prasad – Bhagyalakshmi Bumper Draw
2005: Srihari – Nuvvostanante Nenoddantana
Jagapati Babu – Anukokunda Oka Roju
Shafi – Chhatrapati
Srihari – Mahanandi
Srikanth – Sankranti
2004: Srikanth – Shankar Dada M.B.B.S.Kota Srinivasa Rao – Aa NaluguruShashank – SyeSunil – Mass2003: Prakash Raj – TagoreKrishnam Raju – Neeku Nenu Naaku Nuvvu
Prakash Raj – Amma Nanna O Tamila Ammayi
Shashank – Aithe2002: Prakash Raj – Nuvve Nuvve'Harikrishna – Lahiri Lahiri LahiriloPrakash Raj – KhadgamRavi Teja – Khadgam''

See also 
 Filmfare Awards (Telugu)
 Tollywood

References

Supporting actor